, short for , is a Japanese light novel series by Takafumi Nanatsuki. The light novel has been published by Ichijinsha since December 2011. Eleven volumes have been published. A manga adaptation began serialization in Ichijinsha's Comic Rex magazine in July 2012. A drama CD was released on February 20, 2013. An anime television series adaptation, produced by Silver Link, aired from October 2015 to December 2015.

Plot
Kimito Kagurazaka is an ordinary high school student. One day, he is forcefully enrolled in All-Girls School Seikain, where its noble female students are cut off from the rest of the world to preserve their innocence. However, this deep isolation leaves a large number of school graduates unable to cope with the outside world. To deal with this problem, the school has decided to kidnap a male commoner, Kimito, hoping that his "common man's" influence will be a gentle way to introduce the girls to the realities of life outside. Unfortunately for Kimito, the school only considered him a candidate for this project because they thought that he was a homosexual with a muscle fetish. Therefore, the school concluded that Kimito is no threat to the innocent girls' chastity. Once he learns that he either will face castration or exile should this be proven otherwise, he has no choice but to cooperate. Soon after his enrollment, he has a fateful meeting with Aika Tenkūbashi. Aika is a student who can alternately be shy, stubborn, and pretentious. She is also innocently fascinated by the outside world.

Characters

He is a commoner who is forced to enroll at Seikain after being kidnapped. Kimito immediately notices how detached the girls are from the outside world. His first informal speech at the commencement ceremony leaves them flabbergasted. Seeing a cell phone for the first time excites the girls far more than it should. Kimito has a thing for girls' thighs. The staff has falsely announced to the school that he is a homosexual with a muscle fetish to protect the girls' pride and chastity. To help offset the strain of living up to his false credentials, his room in the school dormitory is renovated to look exactly like his bedroom at his family's home. He and Aika often chat in his room, where he enjoys trolling her with jokes about real-life topics that exploit her tendency for pretension as well as her very real innocence. As the series progresses, his childhood memories begin to resurfaces, thus experiencing a reunion with Miyuki and Aika, although Kimito's girl problems continue in the end.

She is childish, naive, and shy about talking to others. This distances her from them even though she wishes to be popular among her peers. Aika is strongly fascinated of the outside world. The PSP, ramen, and manga are a few of her interests. She asks Kimito to teach her how to be a commoner. Aika declares the establishment of the Commoner Club with Kimito as the master. She seems to have feelings for Kimito beyond that of master and disciple. However, it is shown in a flashback to her childhood that a young boy (Kimito) once helped her escape to see the wonderful things the outside world had to offer. When Aika's family goes bankrupt she is expelled from Seikain. In a surprise turn of events, her parents beg Kimito's family to let them stay at their renovated house for the time-being. During a short period in the outside world, Kimito and Aika get closer, then Aika's father becomes chairman in another company, allowing her to go back to Seikain.

Reiko is considered the most innocent, polite, and cheerful girl in the school. Because of his earnest attempts to help her and the other girls with learning the Commoner Way, she quickly grows fond of Kimito and falls in love with him. She is someone who always acts positive although has a horrible singing voice. However, her personality drastically changes when she learns about Aika's idea for helping her reconcile with her friends and classmates after a certain uncharacteristic outburst. She could not accept Aika's unexpected help and bitterly confronts her for her pity actions. In the end, the situation is resolved amiably. In turn, this breeds a rivalry for Kimito's affections. Reiko joins the Commoner Club to stay close to Kimito and interfere with the advances of other girls. She and Kimito get married in the light novel.

Hakua is a short, soft-spoken, and extremely youthful child prodigy who was very antisocial until she grows attached to Kimito, which shocks her maids. Due to her childlike appearance, Hakua is commonly mistaken for an elementary school student, however she is in-fact 14 years old. Hakua is a genius in the fields of engineering, mathematics, and sciences. She'll occasionally go into strange dazes and at such times, she wriggles out of her clothes as she writes, much to her friends dismay. She habitually documents new equations on any convenient wall. Hakua's maids photograph and document all of her work, as her intellect could lead to many break throughs in the fields of science and mathematics. Her family owns a cellular phone company. Hakua's maids tend to get her and Kimito into intimate moments. Whenever Hakua is with the girls and Kimito in his room or when her and Kimito are alone, she has a tendency to sit in his lap to which the latter does not mind.

Karen is a girl from a samurai family who carries a katana on school grounds. Her fear of insects causes her to reflexively slash others nearby even though their clothes are often the primary casualties. After Karen inadvertently experiences a humiliating defeat at the hands of Kimito, she believes herself to have become weak and swears to stick closely by his side. She is determined to kill him whenever a chance presents itself. She like Aika is a typical tsundere (although more aggressive) and she masks her feelings for Kimito with a fake desire to defeat him. She is sexually attracted towards Hakua. There came a point where Karen felt overexcited for displaying her full potential the first time when invading Reiko's wedding arrangement.

Kimito's personal and head maid (in name only). She is a very sadistic person, often carries out severe punishment whenever Kimito commits a blunder, yet she secretly kisses him in the morning to wake him up. Miyuki knows Kimito because he switched places with her older brother Itsuki (whose face resembles Kimito's but is really aggressive) when they were young to comprehend each other's worlds, and she becomes attracted to him. After switching back; however, Kimito developed a terrible fever which causes him to lose the memories of the events. Soon, Kimito dreams of his past enough to remember Miyuki, having her smile again in a long time. 

Kimito's childhood friend and an idol voice actress. For unknown reasons, she claims to be his girlfriend and is upset about his sudden transfer away from home. In middle school, she was bullied for her unique voice, but Kimito told her that she could become a voice actress. Due to a misunderstanding, she believes that Kimito would not reciprocate her feelings, and so she lied wildly about Kimito being homosexual just to have him to herself, which unintentionally led him to be chosen to enroll at Seikain. She later becomes the second commoner sample as part of a deal after finding her way to Seikain in the hopes of bringing Kimito back.

Hakua's personal maid. She also documents everything that Hakua tendency writes. Unlike the other maids, Sakimori is opening minded about leaving Hakua under Kimito's care. In an extra chapter, Kimito dreams about being married to Sakimori, with a daughter named Yukari, whom a grownup Hakua occasionally visits to tutor. 

Principal of Seikain Girls Academy.

Reiko's personal maid.

Masaomi and Reiko's Mother.

Reiko's older brother who is very protective of his sister, resulting in having a sister complex. He is firmly against Reiko's arranged marriage and turns to Kimito for help.

A friend to Reiko.

She is also a friend to Reiko. 

 She is another friend to Reiko. 

She works along with Eri in a few projects.

Media

Printed media

Shomin Sample began as a light novel series which was published by Ichijinsha between November 11, 2011 and July 20, 2016. The full title is  but was shortened to Shomin Sample. Eleven volumes and one short story volume were released through their Ichijinsha Bunko imprint. The series was later adapted into a manga illustrated by Risumait hat was published in the manga magazine Comic Rex from May 27, 2012 to September 27, 2018. Fifteen bound volumes in total were published by Ichijinsha. The manga adaptation was licensed overseas by Seven Seas Entertainment on September 4, 2015. Seven Seas released the English language volumes for distribution in North America from 2016 to 2021. In addition to the main manga series, a short spinoff called Shomin Sample: I Was Spun Off by an Elite All-Girls School as a Sample Commoner also appeared as a serial in Comic Rex. Two bound volumes were published by Ichijinsha and were released between January–July, 2016. The title uses a pun of the word "spinoff" where 拉致 ("abducted") is replaced by スピンオフ ("supinofu"/"spunoff").

Anime

A 12-episode anime television series adaptation, directed by Masato Jinbo and animated by studio Silver Link. It aired in Japan from October 7 to December 23, 2015. The anime has been licensed by Funimation in North America and Madman Entertainment in Australia. On November 11, 2015, Funimation began streaming the English dubbed episodes as part of its Broadcast Dubs initiative. Anime Limited is distributing the title for Funimation in the United Kingdom and Ireland.

Reception
Ichijinsha announced on Thursday that Takafumi Nanatsuki's light novel Ore ga Ojō-sama Gakkō ni "Shomin Sample" Toshite Rachirareta Ken (Story in Which I Was Kidnapped by a Young Lady's School to be a "Sample of the Common People") will get an anime adaptation.

Ichijinsha published the first volume of the light novel series in November 2011, and it ran for eight volumes. A special edition of the seventh volume bundled a drama CD. Gekka Urū designed the characters for the light novel and Risumai draws a manga adaptation that is serialized in Ichijinsha's Monthly Comic Rex. The fifth compiled volume will ship on July 18 in Japan.

In the romantic comedy's story, an ordinary high school boy is kidnapped by an elite young lady's academy to be a "sample of the common people." The school is full of sheltered girls who have never met male peers before.

References

External links
 
 (anime) 
Shomin Sample at Funimation

2011 Japanese novels
2012 manga
2015 anime television series debuts
Anime and manga based on light novels
Funimation
Harem anime and manga
Ichijinsha Bunko
Ichijinsha manga
Light novels
Madman Entertainment anime
Romantic comedy anime and manga
Seven Seas Entertainment titles
Shōnen manga
Silver Link